The 2003 Philippine Basketball Association (PBA) All-Filipino Cup, or known as the 2003 Samsung-PBA All-Filipino Cup for sponsorship reasons, was the first conference of the 2003 PBA season. It started on February 23 and ended on July 13, 2003. The tournament is an All-Filipino format, which doesn't require an import or a pure-foreign player for each team.

Format
The following format will be observed for the duration of the conference:
The teams were divided into 2 groups.

Group A:
Alaska Aces
FedEx Express
Purefoods TJ Hotdogs
San Miguel Beermen
Sta. Lucia Realtors

Group B:
Barangay Ginebra Kings
Coca-Cola Tigers
Red Bull Thunder
Shell Turbo Chargers
Talk 'N Text Phone Pals

 Teams were divided into two groups but will play a two-round eliminations; 18 games per team; Teams are then seeded by basis on win–loss records. Ties are broken among point differentials of the tied teams.
 The top four teams per group will qualify to the quarterfinals
 Quarterfinals will be a single round robin affair within the groups. Results from the elimination will not be carried over.
 The top two teams per group will qualify to the semifinal round.
Best-of-five semifinals:
SF1: A1 vs. B2
SF2: B1 vs. A2
Third-place playoff: losers of the semifinals
Best-of-seven finals: winners of the semifinals

Elimination round

Group A

Group B

Batang Red Bull won 10 of their first 11 games of the season. The Thunder were on a nine-game winning streak before suffering back-to-back losses to Talk 'N Text and FedEx.

Quarterfinal round

Group A

Alaska beat Sta.Lucia, 75-66, and the Aces got a free ride to the semifinals from the San Miguel Beermen, which beat FedEx, 96-87. The Express were hoping to create a possible three-way tie.

Group B

Talk 'N Text and Coca Cola advances to the semifinals, the Phone Pals defeated Barangay Ginebra, 99-86, while the Tigers nip Batang Red Bull, the team with the best record in the eliminations, 80-79.

Bracket

Semifinals

(A1) Alaska vs. (B2) Talk 'N Text

(B1) Coca Cola vs. (A2) Sta. Lucia

Third place playoff

Finals

References

External links
 PBA.ph

All-Filipino Cup
PBA Philippine Cup